Arcinazzo Romano is a  (municipality) in the Metropolitan City of Rome in the Italian region of Lazio, located about  east of Rome.

Arcinazzo Romano borders the following municipalities: Affile, Jenne, Piglio, Roiate, Serrone, Subiaco, Trevi nel Lazio. It was called Ponza until 1891.

The area of Arcinazzo includes a wide plateau ( in Italian), a popular holiday resort; the plateau is home to the remains of the Villa of Trajan, the summer palace and hunting residence of emperor Trajan.

References

External links
 Official website

Cities and towns in Lazio